O Profeta (English: The Prophet) is a Brazilian telenovela produced and aired by Globo between October 16, 2006 and May 11, 2007. It is adapted by adapted by Thelma Guedes and Duca Rachid, based on the 1977 telenovela of the same name.

It stars Thiago Fragoso, Paola Oliveira, Fernanda Souza, Rodrigo Phavanello, Juliana Didone and Daniel Ávila, Dalton Vigh, Carol Castro, Samara Felippo, Nívea Maria, and Malvino Salvador.

Plot 

The central plot revolves around a handsome and charismatic man named Mark, who grew up with the gift of being completed. As a child, he predicted the completion of his brother, Lucas, but was unable to stop it. Mark went to São Paulo with his sister and his niece, unit 56. While living in São Paulo he fell in love with Sonia, a beautiful young woman, who was engaged to Mark’s cousin Camilo. Camilo worked at the industrial plant Golden Crystals, owned by millionaire Clovis. Carola was an overweight, chubby, and unattractive woman but was blessed with a good read.

Carola fell in love with Mark, and even though it was unrequited, she became a great friend of his. Mark earned a living by using his special powers on a television show. However, after Sonia stops her romance with Mark and is separated from him several times because of Ruth, she decides to marry Clovis, to forget about Mark. But she soon realizes that she still loves Mark after Clovis shows her a sick person that poisoned his first wife, Laura. Clovis knows that Mark and Sonia are in love with each other, and he keeps her under false imprisonment in the attic of his mansion in order to prevent her from escaping.

In addition to beating his wife and repeatedly threatening her, Clovis fails to impregnate her because of his infertility. The daughter, who blames Clovis, is the result of an extra-marital affair with a woman Clovis eventually killed. Because of the death of her mother, the daughter suffered a lot of anguish in life. In the new year, Mark and Sonia manage to escape and they spend a night of love on a beach for the first time together, and Sonia loses her virginity. But Clovis and Sonia once again go back to his house to threaten the life of his father, Piragibe. Some months later, Sonia discovers that she became pregnant with Mark at the end of the new year and needs to hide it from Clovis.

With the help of Carol and delegate Arnaldo Moreira, Sonia is rescued and moves in with Mark, which angers Clovis. Ruth helps Clovis by joining forces to manipulate Sonia and Mark in exchange for shares in the Golden Crystals plant. Mark is gradually forced to use his powers commercially, rather than for the benefit of others.

After numerous kidnappings of Sonia ordered by Clovis, he is eventually poisoned and killed by Ruth, who is caught at the end of the novel. Then, Mark, who began to use his gift properly, joins Sonia in marriage. Their son, named Daniel, born with the gift of healing, which he discovered in the last chapter of the novel, after a passage of 25 years, finds the cure for cancer.

Cast 
 Thiago Fragoso as Marcos Oliveira
 Paolla Oliveira as Sônia Carvalho de Oliveira
 Carol Castro as Ruth Ribeiro de Sousa
 Dalton Vigh as Clóvis Moura
 Fernanda Souza as Carola Ribeiro de Sousa
 Nívea Maria as Maria Luísa "Lia" Ribeiro de Souza
 Malvino Salvador as Camilo de Oliveira
 Juliana Didone as Bárbara de Oliveira Nogueira "Baby"
 Daniel Ávila as Antônio "Tony" Ribeiro de Souza
 Rodrigo Phavanello as Arnaldo de Almeida Correa "Paspalho"
 Vera Zimmermann as Ester de Oliveira Nogueira
 Maurício Mattar as Henrique Nogueira
 Laura Cardoso as Abigail Gomes
 Mauro Mendonça as Francisco Gomes
 Samara Felippo as Wanda "Wandinha" Carvalho
 Fernanda Rodrigues as Gisele da Silva "Gigele"
 Rodrigo Faro as Carlos Zucrini Gonçalves "Tainha"
 Paula Burlamaqui as Teresa Ribeiro Guimarães Leite
 Luciana Braga as Sofia de Abranches Leite
 Luís Gustavo as Piragibe Carvalho
 Zezeh Barbosa as Deolinda "Dedê" Cardoso
 Juliana Baroni as Miriam Carvalho "Troféu"
 Nuno Leal Maia as Alceu Carvalho
 Rosi Campos as Rúbia da Silva/Madame Rúbia
 Arlete Montenegro as Filomena Moura Brandão
 Carolina Kasting as Laura Moura
 Rosina Lobosco as Joana
 Jandir Ferrari as Delegate Régis Moreira
 Mário Gomes as Ernesto da Silva
 Luigi Baricelli as Flávio Leite
 Ana Lúcia Torre as Hilda Vieira
 Neusa Maria Faro as Teodora Sanches
 Andréa Avancini as Edite Zucrini Gonçalves
 Hugo Gross as Jonas (Joílson/Joélson)
 Thiago Luciano as Paulo "Paulito" Gomes
 Armando Babaioff as Matheus Carvalho de Oliveira
 Vitória Pina as Natália Cardoso
 Caroline Smith as Ana Lúcia "Analu" Moura Alencar
 Luana Dandara as Margarida 
 Simone Soares as Zélia Salvador
 José D'Artagnan Jr as Gilberto Eiras
 Renato Rabello as Genésio
 Genézio de Barros as Priest Olavo Oliveira
 Júlia Ruiz as Marília
 Júlia Matos as Rosa
 Orã Figueiredo as Renato Salvador
 Renan Ribeiro as Benjamin
 Guilherme Vieira as Zeca
 Caroline Molinari as Júlia
 Licurgo Spínola as Dr. Michel Garambone
 Cris Vianna as Professora Gilda
 Marcela Monteiro as Dóris
 Luca de Castro as Tarcísio Gomes
 Rogério Falabella as Dr. Diógenes Fonseca
 Gabriel Canella as Isaías

Guest stars 
 Gisele Itié as Sabine Levy
 Henrique Ramiro as Lucas Oliveira
 Simone Spoladore as Luci Carvalho
 Débora Olivieri as Julieta
 Edward Boggis as Pelópidas
 Renata Castro Barbosa as Cida
 Sérgio Mamberti as Marcos' spiritual guide
 Castro Gonzaga as Dr. Klaus Becker
 Mônica Torres as Marisa Monettia
 Tarciana Saad as Rebeca
 Wagner Molina as Raj Ahad 
 Nicette Bruno as Dona Cleide
 Vera Holtz as Ana de Oliveira 
 Stênio Garcia as Jacó de Oliveira
 Gabriel Moura as Child Marcos

External links

2006 Brazilian television series debuts
2006 telenovelas
TV Globo telenovelas
2007 Brazilian television series endings
Brazilian telenovelas
Portuguese-language telenovelas